Atwater is a census-designated place (CDP) in Portage County, Ohio, United States. As of the 2010 census, the CDP had a population of 758. It is located in the central part of Atwater Township, of which it is a part.

Atwater is part of the Akron Metropolitan Statistical Area.

Demographics

History
A post office called Atwater has been in operation since 1824. The community and township have the name of Caleb Atwater, a landowner in the Connecticut Western Reserve.

References

Census-designated places in Portage County, Ohio